Ahliesaurus is a genus of waryfishes.

Species
There are currently two recognized species in this genus:
 Ahliesaurus berryi Bertelsen, G. Krefft & N. B. Marshall, 1976
 Ahliesaurus brevis Bertelsen, G. Krefft & N. B. Marshall, 1976

References

Notosudidae
Taxa named by Erik Bertelsen
Taxa named by Norman Bertram Marshall